Liposcelis ornata is a species of booklouse in the family Liposcelididae. It is found in Central America, North America, and South America.

References

Liposcelis
Articles created by Qbugbot
Insects described in 1978